Fibuloides corinthia is a moth of the family Tortricidae. It is known from China (Yunnan), Taiwan, Sri Lanka and India.

The larvae feed on Litchi chinensis.

References

Enarmoniini
Moths of Japan
Moths described in 1912